Love is War is Vanilla Ninja's fourth studio album, released by EMI Music Germany in May 2006. This is the first album by the girls as a three-piece band. Recording took about six months. Most of the songs are co-written by the band members - Lenna and Piret - making this album the most personal for girls. For example, the song "Kingdom Burning Down" tells a story of their fight with their ex-producer and as they say, "Every song is dedicated to someone and they have important meaning for us." 
The first single from this album was "Dangerzone", which was fairly successful in Germany and Poland. Vanilla Ninja performed this song at the Sopot International Song Festival in Poland. Later, the single "Rockstarz" was released. However, due to many release date changes caused by EMI, the single did not chart well and the band was dropped from the label.

Track listing

B-sides
 "Falling Star" (Found on "Dangerzone" single)

Singles
 "Dangerzone" (2006)
 "Rockstarz" (2006)
 "Insane in Vain" (Estonian radio only) (2007)

Music videos
 "Dangerzone" (2006)
 "Rockstarz" (2006)

Charts

References

External links
 Vanilla Ninja official website

2006 albums
Vanilla Ninja albums